Tylenchorhynchus is a genus of nematodes including many species of plant parasites. The classification of stunt nematodes - those including the genus Tylenchorhynchus - is unstable; many newly discovered species within this genus are reconsidered to be actually subspecies. Stunt nematodes such as Tylenchorhynchus and the closely related genera, Anguillulina and Merlinia, include more than 250 known species. Members of these genera possess similar anatomy and may be easily mistaken for one another. Some debate has led to the classification of single species under different names in two distinct genera (e.g. Tylenchorhynchus cylindricus is Anguillulina dubia).

List of species 
 Tylenchorhynchus brevilineatus
 Tylenchorhynchus claytoni – the tobacco stunt nematode
 Tylenchorhynchus cobb
 Tylenchorhynchus cylindricus 
 Tylenchorhynchus dubius
 Tylenchorhynchus magnicoda  
 Tylenchorhynchus maximus  
 Tylenchorhynchus nudus  
 Tylenchorhynchus phaseoli  
 Tylenchorhynchus vulgaris  
 Tylenchorhynchus zeae

Agricultural diseases 
Tylenchorhynchus are soil dwelling stunt nematodes. They inhabit the same soil as plant root systems in which they can cause stressing or disease in plants. About 8% of the studied species are parasitic. Agricultural problems associated with Tylenchorhynchus spp. affect many species such as soybean, tobacco, tea, oat, alfalfa, sweet potato, sorghum, rose, lettuce, grape, elms, and citrus.

References

External links 
 The Manual of Agricultural Nematology on Google Books

Agricultural pest nematodes
Grape pest nematodes
Parasites of plants
Secernentea genera
Tylenchida